FAH, Fah or Fäh may refer to:

 Fah River, in Eritrea
 Baissa Fali language, spoken in Nigeria
 Faafu Atoll Hospital, in Maldives
 Federation of American Hospitals
 First Affiliated Hospital of Xinjiang Medical University, in China
 Folding@home
 Fumarylacetoacetate hydrolase

Aeronautics 
 ASL Airlines Hungary, a Hungarian airline
 Farah Airport, in Afghanistan
 Honduran Air Force

People 
 Linda Fäh (born 1987), Swiss model and a pageant titleholder
 Claudio Fäh (born 1975), Swiss motion picture director
 Simon Faeh (born 1982), Swiss sprint canoer
 Foil Arms and Hog, comedy trio from the Republic of Ireland